Zviane (pen name of Sylvie-Anne Ménard; born in 1983 in Longueuil) is a comics creator (writer and artist) and a musician from Montréal, Quebec.

Biography
A musician since her youth, Zviane earned a baccalaureate in music from Université de Montréal. She teaches music theory.

Through the art group Vestibulles in cégep du Vieux Montréal, Zviane's works were noticed by Jimmy Beaulieu, who published them in the collections of publishers Mécanique générale and Colosse. Her web blog was noticed by French creator Boulet, who helped her become better known in Europe. Her work Le point B won a contest earning that book to be published by the Monet Library.

In 2009, Zviane spent six months at the Maison des auteurs in Angoulême.

Zviane publishes several comic works each year. She combines music and comics. Music is almost always present in her comics.

Publications

Books and other works 

 Les constats de la vie que l'on constate, Grafigne.com, coll. "Cœur de loup", 2004
 Dans l'estomac, Grafigne.com, coll. "Cœur de loup", 2005
 Le monstre, Grafigne.com, coll. "Cœur de loup", 2006
 Le point B, Monet éditeur, 2006, 128 p., 
 Quelque part entre 9h et 10h, Colosse, 2006
 Comment le dictionnaire fut-il inventé ?, with Charles Ménard as writer, Grafigne.com, coll. "Cœur de loup", 2007
 Des étoiles dans les oreilles, with Martine Rhéaume as cowriter, Société de musique contemporaine du Québec, 2007, 
 La plus jolie fin du monde, éditions Mécanique générale, 2007 
 Étirer un élastique, Fichtre, 2008
 Un incroyable talent, Fichtre, 2008
 Tu pouvais pas savoir, Grafigne.com, coll. "Cœur de loup", 2008
 Les tarifs vont augmenter, Fichtre, 2009
 S'tie qu'on est ben, story and art created with Iris, self-published, 2009
 Le quart de millimètre, éditions Grafigne.com, 2009, 
 Le Mat, Colosse, 2009,  
 Apnée, éditions Pow Pow, 2010, 
 Amsterdam, Grafigne.com, coll. "Cœur de loup", 2010
 Ça s'est passé en 2006 dans un autobus de Longueuil, Colosse, 2010
 Le bestiaire des fruits, self-published, 2011
 L'ostie d'chat, story and art created with Iris, Delcourt, coll. "Shampoing"
 Tome 1, 2011
 Tome 2, 2012
 Tome 3, 2012
 Pain de viande avec dissonances, éditions Pow Pow, 2011, 
 L'ostie d'chat : les bonus, with Iris, 2012 (?), 88 p.
 Stie qu'on est pas ben, story and art created with Sophie Bédard, self-published, 2012
 Les deuxièmes, éditions Pow Pow, 2013, 132 p., 
 Le son de la pluie, self-published, 2013
 Le bestiaire des fruits (enlarged and partly redrawn edition), La Pastèque, collection "Pomélo", 2014, 124 p., 
 Ping-pong, self-published, 2014, 152 p., 
 For as long as it rains, Pow Pow Press, 2015 (the translation in English of Les deuxièmes)
 Club sandwich, éditions Pow Pow, 2016 
 La Jungle, comics magazine launched by Zviane in 2016, self-published, biannual
No 1, October, 2016, 88 p., 
No 2, La Mer, April, 2017

In collective works 
 "Mauve Ciel", in Histoires d'hiver, collective by the winners of the Hachette Canada bande dessinée contest 2009, Glénat Québec, 2009 
 "Bagarre (ou étirer un élastique II)", in Bagarre, collective, Colosse, 2009
 "Esquive" in Partie de pêche, collective by the winners of the Hachette Canada bande dessinée contest 2010, Glénat Québec, 2010 
 "Dans mon corps" in Zik & BD, Éditions de l'Homme, 2010 
 "Devenir grand", with Luc Bossé, in Partie de pêche, collective by the winners of the Hachette Canada bande dessinée contest 2011, Glénat Québec, 2011
 Ping-pong, edition commented by other authors, éditions Pow Pow, 2015, 236 p.,

Other 
 La leçon de classique, with Julien Cayer as writer, a monthly webcomic about classical music, on the website of Espace musique, the music channel of the Société Radio-Canada, 2008
Zviane collaborated with a professor of music at Université de Montréal to make L'œil qui entend, l'oreille qui voit: A model of analysis for the tonal harmonic discourse, an online book about music, using comics, versions in French and in English.

Awards and nominations

Awards 
 Winner of the first Concours québécois de bande dessinée
 First Prize Glénat Québec 2009 for Mauve ciel
 First Prize Glénat Québec 2010 for Esquive
 Fifth Prize Glénat Québec 2011 for Devenir grand, with Luc Bossé
 Bédélys Prize for an independent work 2011 for Le bestiaire des fruits
 Grand prix de la Ville de Québec 2011 (prix Bédéis causa) for Apnée
 Grand prix de la Ville de Québec 2014 (prix Bédéis causa) for Les deuxièmes
 Winner of the Joe Shuster Award for Cartoonist 2014 for Les deuxièmes

Nominations 
 Prix Bédélys Québec, 2007 for La plus jolie fin du monde
 Prix Bédélys fanzine 2008 for Tu pouvais pas savoir
 Prix Bédélys Québec 2010 for Le quart de millimètre
 Prix Bédélys fanzine 2010 for S'tie qu'on est ben
 Prix Bédélys Québec 2011 for Apnée
 Joe Shuster Award for Cover Artist 2011 for Apnée
 Prix Bédélys independent 2014 for Le son de la pluie

Notes and references

External links 

 Zviane's website
 Zviane's blog 
 "L'ostie d'chat" comics, by Zviane and Iris

1983 births
Living people
Canadian graphic novelists
Canadian comics creators
Joe Shuster Award winners for Outstanding Cartoonist
Université de Montréal alumni
21st-century pseudonymous writers
Pseudonymous women writers